Fabio Andrés Duarte Arevalo (born 11 June 1986 in Facatativá, Cundinamarca) is a Colombian track and road cyclist, who currently rides for UCI Continental team . He is best known for winning the 2008 World Under-23 Road Race Championships, and has twice finished in second place during Giro d'Italia stages – in 2013, behind Vincenzo Nibali on stage 20 and 2014, behind Julián Arredondo on stage 18.

Personal life
He has a younger brother, Álvaro Duarte, who is also a professional cyclist.

Major results

2003
 National Junior Track Championships
1st  Individual pursuit
2nd Madison
2005
 1st Vuelta a la Sabana
 1st  Overall Vuelta de la Juventud de Colombia
1st Prologue, Stages 3 & 4
2006
 National Under-23 Road Championships
1st  Time trial
3rd Road race
 1st Overall Clásica Nacional Ciudad de Anapoima
1st Stages 1 & 2
 1st Overall Clasica International de Tulcan
1st Prologue
 1st  Overall Vuelta de la Juventud de Colombia
1st Prologue, Stages 1 & 5
 1st Prologue Clásica Nacional Marco Fidel Suárez
 4th Overall Vuelta a Colombia
1st Stage 10 (TTT)
2007
 1st Stage 12 Vuelta a Colombia
 10th Overall Vuelta por un Chile Líder
2008
 1st  Road race, UCI Under-23 Road World Championships
 1st Stage 2 Circuito de Combita
 1st Stage 2 Clásica Nacional Ciudad de Anapoima
 1st Prologue Vuelta de la Juventud de Colombia
 3rd Time trial, National Road Championships
2009
 1st Overall Clasica International de Tulcan
1st Stages 2 & 3
 1st Overall Tour des Pyrénées
1st Stage 2
 1st Stage 3 Vuelta a Colombia
2010
 1st  Overall Circuito Montañés
1st Stage 4
 1st Stage 2 Clásica Nacional Ciudad de Anapoima
 Vuelta a Colombia
1st Stages 5 & 12
 2nd Overall Vuelta a Asturias
1st Stage 4
 3rd  Time trial, South American Games
 8th Vuelta a La Rioja
2011
 2nd Gran Premio di Lugano
 4th Overall Vuelta a Murcia
 10th Overall Giro del Trentino
1st Stage 3
2012
 1st Coppa Sabatini
 1st Prologue Vuelta a Colombia
 4th Brabantse Pijl
 5th Overall Tour of California
2014
 4th Overall Giro del Trentino
1st Stage 3
 10th Overall Critérium International
2015
 1st  Mountains classification Tour de Luxembourg
 1st  Mountains classification Vuelta a Burgos
2016
 1st Team time trial, National Road Championships
 4th Overall Vuelta a Colombia
2017
 1st Stage 1 (TTT) Vuelta a Colombia
2018
 2nd Overall Vuelta a la Comunidad de Madrid
2019
 1st Stage 1 (TTT) Tour of Qinghai Lake
2020
 1st  Mountains classification Tour Colombia
2022
 1st  Overall Vuelta a Colombia
1st Stage 5

Grand Tour general classification results timeline

Other major stage races

References

External links

 
 

1986 births
Living people
People from Facatativá
Colombian male cyclists
Vuelta a Colombia stage winners
Cyclists at the 2012 Summer Olympics
Olympic cyclists of Colombia
South American Games bronze medalists for Colombia
South American Games medalists in cycling
Competitors at the 2010 South American Games
21st-century Colombian people